Gag is an album released in 1984 by British musician Fad Gadget. It is a combination of electronica and industrial styles, and features the German band Einstürzende Neubauten on the second track, "Collapsing New People", which was also released as a single. ("Einstürzende Neubauten" translates as "Collapsing new buildings - specifically, tower blocks".)

Track listing
"Ideal World" (Frank Tovey, Barbara Frost, Nick Cash) - 5:39
"Collapsing New People" (Frank Tovey, Barbara Frost, David Rogers, David Simmonds, Nick Cash) - 4:22 - produced by Daniel Miller, Frank Tovey, Gareth Jones
"Sleep" (Frank Tovey, Daniel Miller) - 3:25
"Stand Up" (Frank Tovey, David Rogers, David Simmonds) - 3:30
"Speak to Me" (Frank Tovey, Joni Sackett) - 3:23
"One Man's Meat" (Frank Tovey, David Simmonds, Joni Sackett) - 4:06
"Ring" (Frank Tovey, David Simmonds) - 3:53
"Jump" (Frank Tovey, Joni Sackett, Nick Cash) - 4:09
"Ad Nauseam" (Frank Tovey) - 6:32

Personnel
Frank Tovey – vocals
David Simmonds - piano, synthesizer, organ, celesta, percussion, marimba
Nick Cash – drums, percussion
David Rogers - guitar, double bass, bass synthesizer 
Joni Sackett - vocals, viola
Barbara Frost - vocals
Rowland S. Howard - guitar on "Ideal World" and "Ad Nauseam"
Morgan Tovey-Frost - voice on "Sleep"
Technical
John Fryer - overdub engineer
Anton Corbijn - photography

The overdubs on "Ideal World" and "Ad Nauseam" recorded at Blackwing Studios, London

References

1984 albums
Fad Gadget albums
Albums produced by Gareth Jones (music producer)
Mute Records albums